Myamaropsis is an extinct genus of wasp currently comprising a single species Myamaropsis turolensis.

References

Taxa named by Michael S. Engel